KXRO (1320 kHz) is a commercial AM radio station broadcasting a news/talk radio format. Licensed to Aberdeen, Washington, the station serves the Grays Harbor section of Washington.  It is currently owned by Alpha Media LLC.

KXRO is also heard on a 250 watt FM translator, 101.7 MHz K269FT in Hoquiam.

Programming
Weekday mornings begin with a news and information program, the "KXRO Morning News."  That's followed with a call-in show, "Live @ Nine."  The rest of the schedule is made up of nationally syndicated shows including Dave Ramsey, Clark Howard, Thom Hartmann, Dana Loesch, Clyde Lewis and Coast to Coast AM with George Noory.  Most hours begin with world and national news from CBS Radio News.

History
KXRO dates back more than 90 years, first signing on the air on May 28, 1928.  Its studios and offices were originally located in Hotel Morck, a noted resort hotel in Aberdeen.  Its power was only 100 watts at first, and it was owned by KXRO, Inc.  It spent time on several different radio frequencies.

With the enactment of the North American Regional Broadcasting Agreement (NARBA) in 1941, KXRO moved to 1340 kHz, powered at 250 watts.  It was a network affiliate of the Mutual Broadcasting System and the Don Lee Network during the "Golden Age of Radio."

In 1950, KXRO moved to 1320 kHz, its current dial position.  That was coupled with an increase in power to 1,000 watts.  In the 1960s, it got another boost in daytime power, to 5,000 watts.  As the era of network programming ended for radio and moved to television, KXRO adopted a full service middle of the road music format.

By the 1990s, KXRO had moved from a mix of music and talk to all talk.

References

External links

FCC History Cards for KXRO

XRO
News and talk radio stations in the United States
Alpha Media radio stations